Karim City College, Jamshedpur, established in 1961, is one of the oldest degree college in the Jharkhand state of India with a view to impart education to the weaker section of Jamshedpur.

It offers Intermediate, Undergraduate and Postgraduate courses in arts, commerce and science. It is a Muslim minority institution under Karim's Trust and permanently affiliated to  Kolhan University.

Departments

Faculty of Arts

Faculty of Humanities 
 Bangla
 English
 Hindi
 Urdu
 Oriya
 Philosophy

Faculty of Social Science 
 Economics
 History
 Geography
 Political Science
 Psychology

Faculty of Science 
 Biology
 Botany
 Zoology
 Chemistry
 Mathematics
 Physics

Faculty of Commerce 
 Commerce

See also 
Education in India
Literacy in India
List of institutions of higher education in Jharkhand

References

External links

Colleges affiliated to Kolhan University
Educational institutions established in 1961
Universities and colleges in Jharkhand
Education in Jamshedpur